Mario Zanini, or simply Zanini (September 10, 1907 in São Paulo – August 16, 1971 in São Paulo), was a Brazilian painter and interior designer.

He was born in a humble family. As a teenager he studied in the Escola de Belas de São Paulo, or "School of Arts of São Paulo". He ran for the major art prizes of the country. Travelled to  Europe in 1950 for studying. He was also in the first three São Paulo Art Biennials.

He was part of the Grupo Santa Helena, that would be a nucleus for the Família Artística Paulista, or "Artistic Family of São Paulo". What distinguishes him from the average integrants of the Grupo do Santa Helena and the Família Artística Paulista were his deep, intense colors, almost naive. He and Alfredo Volpi were the great masters of color in the Brazilian painting history.

See also

 List of Brazilian painters

References

  Vista da Ponte e Vaso de Flores
  São Francisco
  Obra de Mario Zanini
  Diversos

1907 births
1971 deaths
Modern artists
Brazilian people of Italian descent
People from São Paulo
20th-century Brazilian painters
20th-century Brazilian male artists